Thimo I, Count of Wettin (9 March 1090/1091 or c. 1100), a member of the Wettin dynasty, was Count of Wettin and Brehna.

Life
Thimo was a younger son of Margrave Theodoric II, Margrave of Lower Lusatia and his wife Mathilda, a daughter of Margrave Eckard I of Meissen. When his father was killed in 1034, Thimo succeeded him in his Wettin and Brehna home territories. He also served as Vogt (bailiff) of the Naumburg diocese and of the Wettin family monastery in Gerbstedt.

In the Saxon Rebellion of 1073–75, Thimo fought against King Henry IV and also quarreled with his brother Bishop Frederick of Münster. Later he again approached the king and in 1088 attended the Hoftag diet in Quedlinburg, where the Brunonid margrave Egbert II of Meissen was deposed.
 
The exact year of Thimo's death is unclear; since his son Conrad was born in approximately 1098, Thimo cannot have died long before this year. Alternatively, some researchers assume that Thimo was in fact Conrad's grandfather, and that Conrad's father was an unknown son of Thimo's with the same name, making a death year of 1090/91 possible, as given in a chronicle. However, since Thimo II is not otherwise attested, this is considered unlikely.

Thimo is buried at the monastery of Niemegk, which he had founded.

Marriage and children
Thimo married Ida, daughter of Count Otto of Nordheim. Together they had three children:
Dedi IV (died 16 December 1124), Count of Wettin, married Berta, daughter of Margrave Wiprecht of Groitzsch, died without male heirs
Conrad, Margrave of Meissen (c. 1097–1157)
Mathilde, married Count Gero I of Seeburg in 1115, and secondly Count Louis of Wippra in 1123

1010s births
11th-century deaths
House of Wettin
Counts of the Holy Roman Empire

Year of birth uncertain
Year of death uncertain